This is a list of the Australian moth species of the family Yponomeutidae. It also acts as an index to the species articles and forms part of the full List of moths of Australia.

Attevinae
Atteva albiguttata (Zeller, 1873)
Atteva charopis Turner, 1903
Atteva megalastra Meyrick, 1907
Atteva niphocosma Turner, 1903

Praydinae
Prays amblystola Turner, 1923
Prays autocasis Meyrick, 1907
Prays calycias Meyrick, 1907
Prays inscripta Meyrick, 1907
Prays nephelomima Meyrick, 1907
Prays parilis Turner, 1923
Prays tyrastis Meyrick, 1907

The following species belongs to the subfamily Praydinae, but has not been assigned to a genus yet. Given here is the original name given to the species when it was first described:
Eriocottis euryphracta Meyrick, 1893

Yponomeutinae
Anoista insolita Turner, 1939
Charicrita citrozona Meyrick, 1913
Charicrita orthonina Turner, 1927
Charicrita sericoleuca Turner, 1923
Chionogenes drosochlora (Meyrick, 1907)
Chionogenes isanema (Meyrick, 1907)
Chionogenes trimetra Meyrick, 1913
Lissochroa argostola Turner, 1923
Litaneutis sacrifica Meyrick, 1913
Niphonympha oxydelta (Meyrick, 1913)
Nymphonia zaleuca Meyrick, 1913
Opsiclines leucomorpha (Lower, 1900)
Orsocoma macrogona Meyrick, 1921
Palleura nitida Turner, 1926
Spaniophylla epiclithra Turner, 1917
Teinoptila interruptella Sauber, 1902
Xyrosaris acroxutha Turner, 1923
Xyrosaris dryopa Meyrick, 1907
Yponomeuta internellus (Walker, 1863)
Yponomeuta liberalis (Meyrick, 1913)
Yponomeuta myriosema (Turner, 1898)
Yponomeuta paurodes Meyrick, 1907
Yponomeuta pustulellus (Walker, 1863)
Zelleria aphrospora Meyrick, 1893
Zelleria araeodes Meyrick, 1893
Zelleria callidoxa Meyrick, 1893
Zelleria citrina Meyrick, 1893
Zelleria cremnospila Lower, 1900
Zelleria cryptica Meyrick, 1913
Zelleria cyanoleuca (Lower, 1908)
Zelleria cynetica Meyrick, 1893
Zelleria euthysema Turner, 1923
Zelleria hemixipha Lower, 1900
Zelleria isopyrrha Meyrick, 1921
Zelleria malacodes Turner, 1939
Zelleria memorella Meyrick, 1893
Zelleria mystarcha Meyrick, 1893
Zelleria orthopleura Turner, 1923
Zelleria panceuthes Turner, 1923
Zelleria proterospila Meyrick, 1893
Zelleria pyroleuca Meyrick, 1893
Zelleria sigillata Meyrick, 1893
Zelleria stylograpta Meyrick, 1907

The following species belongs to the subfamily Yponomeutinae, but has not been assigned to a genus yet. Given here is the original name given to the species when it was first described:
Amblyzancla araeoptila Turner, 1939

External links 
Yponomeutidae at Australian Faunal Directory

Australia